Paul Lorenzen (March 24, 1915 – October 1, 1994) was a German philosopher and mathematician, founder of the Erlangen School (with Wilhelm Kamlah) and inventor of game semantics (with Kuno Lorenz).

Biography
Lorenzen studied at the University of Göttingen until he earned his PhD there in 1938 under Helmut Hasse with a thesis titled Zur Abstrakten Begründung der multiplikativen Idealtheorie. In 1939, he became an assistant to Wolfgang Krull at the University of Bonn. His main work was on the foundations of mathematics—proof theory. He created and modified constructive mathematics. Lorenzen taught at Stanford, the University of Texas, and Boston University in the USA. He was John Locke Lecturer in 1967/1968.

Theory
Lorenzen came in 1962 to University of Erlangen (South Germany) and founded the Erlangen School of epistemological constructivism there.

He wrote with Wilhelm Kamlah the famous book Logical Propaedeutic ("Logische Propädeutik") and worked on game semantics (Dialogische Logik) with Kuno Lorenz. With Peter Janich he invented protophysics of time and space. He developed constructive logic, constructive type theory and constructive analysis.

Lorenzen's work on calculus Differential and Integral was dedicated to Hermann Weyl. Lorenzen used Weyl's technique to develop a predicative analysis, which can reconstruct classical analysis, without the principle of excluded middle or the axiom of choice. He worked also on Gerhard Gentzen's cut elimination to find a way to continue Hilbert's program after the results of Gödel.

In the theory of geometry and physics, Lorenzen was influenced by Hugo Dingler. He followed Dingler in building up geometry and physics out of primitive operations. Lorenzen took an early interpretation of Steven Weinberg (Gravitation and Cosmology, 1972) for his doubts about geometrical elements of general relativity, believing that Maxwell's equations are to be modified by general relativity instate.

Lorenzen was also influenced by Wilhelm Dilthey's hermeneutics, and liked to quote Dilthey's saying that knowledge cannot go behind life. Dilthey's Lebensphilosophie was the description of the setting in ordinary experience in which we construct the abstractions of mathematics and physics.

As John Locke Lecturer he invented normative logic as a base on ethics and political argumentation.

Major works
 Paul Lorenzen, Frederick J. Crosson (Translator), Formal Logic, Springer, New York, July 1964.
 Paul Lorenzen, Normative Logic and Ethics, Mannheim/Zürich, 1969.
 Paul Lorenzen, John Bacon (Translator), Differential and Integral: A constructive introduction to classical analysis, The University of Texas Press, Austin, 1971.
 Paul Lorenzen, Lehrbuch der konstruktiven Wissenschaftstheorie, Mannheim/Zürich, 1984.
 Paul Lorenzen, Karl Richard Pavlovic (Translator), Constructive Philosophy, The University of Massachusetts Press, Amherst, 1987.

References
 Wilhelm Kamlah, Paul Lorenzen, Logical Propaedeutic: Pre-School of Reasonable Discourse, Washington, D.C.: University Press of America, 1984.
 Diane Loring Souvaine, Paul Lorenzen and Constructive Mathematics, 1980.

External links

Books from and about Lorenzen at Deutsche National Bibliothek 

1915 births
1994 deaths
20th-century German mathematicians
20th-century German philosophers
Continental philosophers
German logicians
Proof theorists
Philosophers of language
University of Bonn alumni
German male writers
Relativity critics